Dracula, also known as Bram Stoker's Dracula and Dan Curtis' Dracula, is a 1974 British made-for-television gothic horror film and adaptation of Bram Stoker's 1897 novel Dracula. It was written by Richard Matheson and directed by Dark Shadows creator Dan Curtis, with Jack Palance in the title role. It was the second collaboration for Curtis and Palance after the 1968 TV film The Strange Case of Dr. Jekyll and Mr. Hyde.

Plot
"Bistritz, Hungary May 1897": natives in Transylvania seem afraid when they learn solicitor Jonathan Harker is going to Castle Dracula. Jonathan finds the Count abrupt and impatient to get things done. Dracula reacts very strongly to a photograph of Harker's fiancée Mina and her best friend, Lucy. After preventing his brides from devouring Harker, he forces the young solicitor to write a letter saying he will be staying in Transylvania for a month. Harker climbs down the castle wall and finds Dracula's coffin but is attacked and knocked out by one of Dracula's gypsy servants before he can stake Dracula. They later throw him in the lower levels of the crypt, where the brides attack him again.

The Demeter runs aground carrying only Dracula and the dead captain lashed to the wheel. Soon after, Lucy begins to fall ill. Her fiancé, Arthur Holmwood, is perplexed and calls in Dr. Van Helsing. The doctor starts to recognize what might be happening, especially after Lucy walks out of her home at Hillingham and is found, drained of blood, under a tree the next morning. Dracula has flashbacks of his wife– of whom Lucy is the spitting image– on her deathbed centuries earlier.

Lucy's mother is in the room with Mina when Dracula comes calling the last time, a wolf shattering the window. Lucy soon rises from the dead and comes to the window of Arthur's home, begging to be let in. Arthur does so, delighted and amazed that she's alive, unaware that she is now a vampire under Dracula's control. This very nearly gets him bitten, but Van Helsing interrupts with a cross causing her to flee. They go to Lucy's grave and drive a wooden stake into her heart. When Dracula comes to the tomb later and beckons to her, he goes berserk upon finding that she's truly dead.

Mina tells Van Helsing about the news story about the Demeter, the boxes of earth, and Jonathan going to meet Dracula to sell him a house. From these clues, Van Helsing and Holmwood go about finding all but one of Dracula's "boxes of earth" (containing his native soil, in which a vampire must rest). But back at the hotel, the vampire hunters discover Dracula is there seeking revenge. He has bitten Mina and, before their eyes, forces her to drink blood from a self-inflicted gash in his chest. All that they love, all that is theirs, he will take, he says.

The tracking of Dracula back to his home commences with Van Helsing hypnotizing Mina. Via the bond of blood, she sees through Dracula's eyes and discovers where he is headed. At the castle, Van Helsing and Holmwood find and stake the brides. Jonathan, now a rabid and bloodthirsty vampire, attacks Arthur and Van Helsing, but in the struggle is knocked by Arthur into a pit of spikes and killed. The final confrontation with Dracula takes place in what looks like a grand ballroom. The crosses wielded by the two men are something Dracula doesn't seem to want to look upon. Dracula gets the better of them, ridding them of their crosses. Van Helsing pulls down the window curtains, and sunlight pours in. Dracula is weakened, finally going dormant long enough for Van Helsing to pierce his heart with a long spear.

They leave him there. Before the portrait of a living warrior Dracula, with Lucy's lookalike in the background, a text scrolls across the screen about a warlord who lived in the area of Hungary known as Transylvania, and how it was said he had found a way to conquer death– a legend no one has ever disproven.

Cast
 Jack Palance as Count Dracula / Vlad III the Impaler
 Simon Ward as Arthur Holmwood
 Nigel Davenport as Abraham Van Helsing
 Fiona Lewis as Lucy Westenra / Maria, Dracula's deceased wife
 Murray Brown as Jonathan Harker
 Penelope Horner as Mina Murray
 Pamela Brown as Mrs. Westenra
 Sarah Douglas as one of Dracula's wives
 Virginia Wetherell as one of Dracula's wives 
 Barbara Lindley as one of Dracula's wives
 George Pravda as Innkeeper
 Hana Maria Pravda as Innkeeper's wife
 Reg Lye as Zookeeper
 John Challis as Stockton-on-Tees clerk
 John Pennington as Shipping clerk

Production
Dan Curtis decided to film Bram Stoker's Dracula in two locations: Yugoslavia, where there were old castles and quiet land, and England, where the remainder of the story is set.

Release 
The initial CBS-TV broadcast in October 1973 was pre-empted for an address by Richard Nixon on the resignation of Spiro Agnew. Instead it was broadcast in February 1974. CBS took advantage of the successful release of director Francis Ford Coppola's identically titled adaptation, Bram Stoker's Dracula (1992), to rebroadcast the film on 28 November 1992 (two weeks after Coppola's film opened).

Legacy 
The film was released on VHS and Laserdisc. In the 1990s, Columbia Pictures and Coppola, who wanted to emphasize that his cinematic adaptation of Dracula would be unlike any that had come before, purchased the rights to the title Bram Stoker's Dracula. Nearly all subsequent home video releases of the earlier film have been under the title Dan Curtis' Dracula, or simply Dracula.

In addition to the title of Curtis' movie, Coppola also utilized its two key elements which distinguish it from previous adaptations: the depiction of Dracula and Vlad the Impaler– the historical Dracula– as being the same person, and the relationship between Dracula and his reincarnated wife (Lucy in the 1974 movie, and Mina in the 1992 film). 

According to a featurette on a DVD release of the film, Palance was asked to reprise the role of Dracula several times, but he always declined.

The Marvel Comics series The Tomb of Dracula features a Dracula whose appearance was based on Jack Palance. The series debuted in 1972, before Palance had actually played the role of Dracula. Artist Gene Colan was inspired by Palance's performance in The Strange Case of Dr. Jekyll and Mr. Hyde (1968), Curtis and Palance's previous television movie.

See also
 Vampire film

References

External links
 
 
 
 Transcribed script online

1974 television films
1974 horror films
1974 films
British horror television films
British vampire films
Dracula films
Dracula television shows
Films about reincarnation
Films set in Transylvania
Films set in 1897
CBS network films
Films directed by Dan Curtis
Films with screenplays by Richard Matheson
Polygamy in fiction
Cultural depictions of Vlad the Impaler
Films set in castles
1970s English-language films
1970s British films